Karschia is a genus of karschiid camel spiders, first described by Alfred Walter in 1889.

Species 
, the World Solifugae Catalog accepts the following twenty-six species:

 Karschia badkhyzica Gromov, 1998 — Turkmenistan
 Karschia birulae Roewer, 1934 — China
 Karschia borszczevskii Birula, 1935 — Uzbekistan
 Karschia caucasica (L. Koch, 1878) — Azerbaijan
 Karschia cornifera Walter, 1899 — Turkmenistan
 Karschia gobiensis Gromov, 2004 — Mongolia
 Karschia gurkoi Gromov, 2004 — Tajikistan
 Karschia kaznakovi Birula, 1922 — Turkmenistan, Uzbekistan
 Karschia kiritshenkoi Birula, 1922 — Iran
 Karschia koenigi Birula, 1922 — Turkmenistan
 Karschia kononenkoi Gromov, 2004 — Uzbekistan
 Karschia kopetdaghica Gromov, 1998 — Turkmenistan
 Karschia kurdistanica Birula, 1935 — Iran, Iraq
 Karschia mangistauensis Gromov, 1993 — Kazakhstan
 Karschia mastigofera Birula, 1890 — Armenia, Azerbaijan, Georgia, Turkey
 Karschia mongolica Roewer, 1933 — Mongolia
 Karschia nasuta Kraepelin, 1899 — Kyrgyzstan
 Karschia nubigena Lawrence, 1954 — Nepal
 Karschia pedaschenkoi Birula, 1922 — Kyrgyzstan
 Karschia persica Kraepelin, 1899 — Iran
 Karschia rhinoceros Birula, 1922 — China, Tajikistan
 Karschia tadzhika Gromov, 2004 — Tajikistan
 Karschia tarimina Roewer, 1933 — China
 Karschia tibetana Hirst, 1907 — China
 Karschia tienschanica Roewer, 1933 — China
 Karschia zarudnyi Birula, 1922 — Kazakhstan, Kyrgyzstan, Tajikistan, Uzbekistan

References 

Arachnid genera
Solifugae